"When I Grow Too Old to Dream" is a popular song with music by Sigmund Romberg and lyrics by Oscar Hammerstein II, published in 1934.

The song was introduced by Evelyn Laye and Ramon Novarro in the film The Night Is Young (1935). It has since become a pop standard, recorded by many artists, notably Nat King Cole, The Everly Brothers and Gracie Fields.

Other versions
In 1949, Rose Murphy went to number 10 on the Most-Played Juke Box Race Records chart with her version.
A 1951 recording by Gordon Jenkins was released as the flip side of his hit, "Charmaine" (Decca Records).
Ed Townsend released a version of the song as a single in 1958 that reached number 59 on the Billboard pop chart.
Bing Crosby included the song in a medley on his album Join Bing and Sing Along (1959)
Jazz organist Jimmy Smith released a version of the song on his 1963 album Back at the Chicken Shack
Julie London recorded the song on her album Nice Girls Don't Stay for Breakfast released in 1967
Stéphane Grappelli and The Diz Dizley Trio recorded this on their 1975 album Violinspiration
Linda Ronstadt recorded the song on her 1978 album Living in the USA and performed the song on an episode of The Muppet Show.
Slim Dusty recorded the song on his 1997 album A Time To Remember.
A segment of "When I Grow Too Old to Dream" is used in the chorus of the song "Too Old To Dream" on O'Hooley & Tidow's album Silent June (2010).

In popular culture
The song was featured in a 1935 MGM musical film called The Night Is Young starring Ramon Novarro and Evelyn Laye. The song is referred to in the film I Never Sang for My Father as the song the father had always asked his son to sing. 
In the Australian soap opera A Place to Call Home, Elizabeth Bligh (Noni Hazlehurst) sings the song at Douglas' refuge in the episode called "Too Old to Dream".

References

External links
Recordings from the Internet Archive.

1934 songs
1935 singles
1958 singles
Songs about old age
Songs with music by Sigmund Romberg
Songs with lyrics by Oscar Hammerstein II
Ed Townsend songs
Capitol Records singles
Irene Dunne songs